Eudulophasia invaria is a species of moth in the family Geometridae first described by Francis Walker in 1854.

Description
The wings are bright orange with a narrow black border. Antennae, tarsi and tibiae are black.

Distribution
This species can be found in Mexico, British Honduras, Guatemala, Costa Rica, Panama, Colombia and Venezuela.

References

Eudulini
Geometridae of South America
Moths described in 1854
Moths of South America